The Secretariat Building or formerly known as the Brunei Government Offices and Government Secretariat Building (Bangunan Setiausaha Kerajaan) is the oldest government structure that serves as "The Secretariat" or the seat of government. The building is located at Jalan Elizabeth II, Bandar Seri Begawan, Brunei-Muara District, Brunei. The building is currently under the protection of the Antiquities and Treasure Trove Act of the Museums Department.

Design and construction
With a face-brick pattern on the front and on the concrete porch of the building, the impact of the era's stunning colonial architecture can be observed. The iron fence outside the building's windows is adorned with wreaths and a capital sculpture depicting a range of communal events, which enhances the structure's aesthetic appeal. The carvings at the top front side of the building that depict the people of Brunei in their traditional way of life attracted our attention as one intriguing aspect of the structure. There are several park seats located nearby the building and faces Padang Besar, now known as Taman Sir Omar 'Ali Saifuddien.

History
Brunei Government Offices began construction in 1952 and a stone was honorably laid by Sultan Omar Ali Saifuddien III on 19 November 1952. The building was finally completed in 1953. At the beginning of its establishment on 1 July 1954, the Royal Customs and Traditions Department of the Prime Minister's Office was located in the General Office of the Government Secretariat Building. After the Supreme Court's establishment in 1963, it has previously used portion of Secretariat Building as their main building. Birthday of Queen Elizabeth on June 8, 1968, was honored with a ceremonial procession in front of the Secretariat Building in Brunei Town.

As soon as Brunei attained complete independence in 1984, the Ministry of Communications was founded. It was established in the Secretariat Building, before it's relocation to the Brunei Telecom Department Building at the Old Airport, Berakas. On 10 August 2005, Crown Prince Al-Muhtadee Billah agreed to attend a briefing on the duties of the Prime Minister's Office, including strategic planning, organizational structure, and the Prime Minister's Office's e-government plan, at the Secretariat Building in the nation's capital. Some of Radio Television Brunei's (RTB) departments and divisions have relocated to new quarters in the Secretariat Building on 15 June 2020.

See also
 Politics of Brunei
 Bandar Seri Begawan

References

External links

Government of Brunei

Buildings and structures in Bandar Seri Begawan
Historic sites in Brunei